Champat Rai Jain (6 August 1867–2 June 1942) was a Digambara Jain born in Delhi and who studied and practised law in England. He became an influential Jainism scholar and comparative religion writer between 1910s and 1930s who translated and interpreted Digambara texts. In early 1920s, he became religiously active in India and published essays and articles defending Jainism against misrepresentations by colonial era Christian missionaries, contrasting Jainism and  Christianity. He founded Akhil Bharatvarsiya Digambara Jain Parisad in 1923 with the aim of activist reforms and uniting the south Indian and north Indian Digambara community. He visited various European countries to give lectures on Jainism. He was conferred with the title Vidya-Varidhi (lit. Ocean of Wisdom) by Bharata Dharma Mahamandal (The India-Religious Association).

Life 
Champat Rai Jain was born on 6 August 1867 in Delhi, India. He was married at the age of 13. In 1892, he went to England to study law, and became a barrister. 

Champat Rai Jain was a Digambara, whose writings represent that sect's propaganda with his personal interpretations, according to Robert Williams. Jain became a part of a Digambara group presenting Digambara point of view in the 1920s and 1930s such as with Jagadarlal Jaini, Nathuram Premi, Jugalkishor Mukhtar and Hiralal Jain. Jain was the founder of the Jaina mission in London. He died on 2 June 1942. He was a barrister-at-law, orator, writer, and attempted to explain Jainism with modern age psychology and science terminology.

According to Padmanabh Jaini, the colonial-era Champat Rai Jain was an apologist of Jainism, defended the Jain doctrines that were criticized by Christian missionaries, and authored the first Jaina text aimed at the Christian world when Christian missionaries were extremely frustrated at Jain people they understood to have "no pagan gods" and refused to convert to Christianity. He was among the early 20th-century Jain activists who participated in the colonial discussion about whether Jains are culturally Hindus or a minority community.

He became a part of Digambara activists who sought to energise and reform Digambara community. He participated in several Digambara societies, and founded Akhil Bharatvarsiya Digambara Jain Parisad in 1923 with the aim of activist reforms, reducing caste divisions within Jain society, and uniting the south Indian and north Indian Digambara community.

Lectures 
Champat Rai Jain attempted to present Jainism as a scientific religion:

 Jaina Doctrine - Lecture delivered before the "Association des Amis de l'Orient" (Paris) on 28 November 1926
 Jainism And Its Power To Stop Human Warfare- Lecture delivered before "Le Trait d'Union" Society at Nice
 Religion and Comparative Religion- Lecture delivered at Genova, Italy (6 January 1927)
 Ahimsa as the Key to World Peace at the World Fellowship of Faiths (1933)

Publications 
Champat Rai Jain wrote in three main languages of his time: English, Hindi, Urdu.

According to Williams, the translations of Champat Rai Jain were of "no high merit", he added his own interpretation often "disfiguring the sense of the original" Jain texts about monastic life and doctrines for Jain laypeople.

The Key of Knowledge (1915, 1919, 1928)
The Householder's Dharma (1917): English translation of the Jain text, Ratnakaranda śrāvakācāra.
The Practical Dharma (1929)- Second edition of "The Practical Path" (1917)
Confluence of Opposites (1921)
The Jain Law (1926) 
Nyaya- The Science of Thought (1916, 1924)
Jainism, Christianity and Science (Allahabad, 1930)
The Lifting Of The Vell or The Gems Of Islam (1931)
The Practical Dharma (1929)
Risabha Deva- The Founder of Jainism (1929, 1935)
Sannyasa Dharma (1926)

Essays and Addresses
What is Jainism (Essays and Addresses- I)
Jainism and World Problems (Essays and Addresses- II)
The Change of Heart (Essays and Addresses- III)

Hindi 
 Jain Law
 Sanatana Jain Dharma

Urdu 
Jawahrat-e-Islam

Gallery

"Key of Knowledge", a book authored by Champat Rai Jain, was published in 1915.

Reception
Vijay K. Jain, a modern Jainism scholar in the Preface of his book From IIM-Ahmedabad To Happiness wrote:

See also 
 Jainism in Europe
 Bal Patil

References

Citations

Sources 

  Alt URL
 
 
 
 
 
  Alt URL

External links 
 

Scholars of Jainism
Indian barristers
1867 births
1942 deaths
20th-century Indian Jain writers
Jain law
19th-century Indian Jain writers
19th-century Indian lawyers
20th-century Indian lawyers
Writers from Delhi